Romeo + Juliet, as it is displayed in print, is a ballet by New York City Ballet balletmaster-in-chief Peter Martins to Sergei Prokofiev's Romeo and Juliet (1934–1940). The premiere took place on Tuesday, 1 May 2007 at the New York State Theater, Lincoln Center.

Casts

Original

NYCB revivals

2009 Spring

Footnotes 

2007 ballet premieres
Ballets by Peter Martins
Ballets by Sergei Prokofiev
Ballets based on Romeo and Juliet
New York City Ballet repertory